Jyrki Tujunen (born 20 November 1968) is a Finnish former cyclist. He competed in the individual pursuit event at the 1988 Summer Olympics.

References

1968 births
Living people
Finnish male cyclists
Olympic cyclists of Finland
Cyclists at the 1988 Summer Olympics
Sportspeople from Helsinki